The 1985 massacre in Muttur was a slaughter of Tamil civilians in the town of Muttur in Eastern Province, Sri Lanka. The massacre occurred when all three divisions of the Sri Lankan military attacked the town by land, air and sea. The motive of the attacks was deliberately aimed at slaughtering ethnic Tamils, who formed the local population in the region. The killings lasted for 3 days from 8 November to 11 November.

Casualties
Civilians were shot, killed and burnt with their houses. Over 30 people were confirmed to have been killed. And over 70 others who have been arrested or have been forcibly disappeared were not accounted for. Several others who attempted to escape and those who sought refuge at temples were also killed.

See also
 2006 Trincomalee massacre of NGO workers

Sources
THE NORTHEAST SECRETARIAT ON HUMAN RIGHTS (NESOHR). Massacres of Tamils (1956-2008)p. 14–15. Chennai: Manitham Publishers, 2009. 

1985 crimes in Sri Lanka
Attacks on civilians attributed to the Sri Lanka Air Force
Attacks on civilians attributed to the Sri Lanka Army
Attacks on civilians attributed to the Sri Lanka Navy
Massacres in Sri Lanka
Massacres in 1985
Mass murder of Sri Lankan Muslims
Mass murder of Sri Lankan Tamils
Sri Lankan government forces attacks in the Sri Lankan Civil War
Terrorist incidents in Sri Lanka in 1985